Julie Speed (born 1951, Chicago, Illinois) is an American artist. After dropping out of Rhode Island School of Design at age 19, Speed spent her twenties moving around the U.S. and Canada working pickup jobs (house painter, horse trainer, ad writer, farm worker, etc.) until moving to Texas in 1978, where she settled down and taught herself to paint. She switches back and forth regularly between oil painting, printmaking, collage, gouache and drawing, often combining disciplines. Two large volumes of her work, Julie Speed, Paintings, Constructions and Works on Paper, 2004 and Speed, Art 2003-2009 have been published by the University of Texas. She lives and works in Marfa, Texas. In her words, “I keep hours just like a real job, only longer, and in my spare time I read books, drink tequila, and garden.”

Style and technique 

Speed paints surreal scenes in a realistic style with oil and gouache. Her collages incorporate scientific illustrations and architectural drawings.
In collaboration with her husband Fran Christina, and Flatbed Press in Austin, Texas, she creates limited edition etchings.

"Speed’s work has been described as surrealist, hallucinogenic, iconoclastic and absurdist. Her detailed microorganism paintings, such as Blue or Metamporphoses, bring to mind the intricate scientific prints of Ernst Haeckel. The disquiet of her portraits, particularly the Hostage and Jawbone series, evoke the unflinching pathos of Otto Dix. Her continued reference to Renaissance themes and images combine the allegory of Bosch and Bruegel with the flatness usually found in Mexican primitivism. And yet, none of these influences begin to encapsulate the strangeness of Speed’s work. Speed’s unique vision is most pronounced in collage, although this term is inadequate to fully describe her compositions, which combine etching, gouache, mixed media, ink, and found paper. The animating spirit of her work lies in the spirit of collage — even her paintings seem to stem from some incongruous “other” place, a hidden layer hovering imperceptibly in the background, immediately jarring the viewer. “

-Leigh Baldwin ( February 2013) “Force of Confusion”  published by The Southwest School of Art, San Antonio

"Julie Speed is a quirky neo-Surrealist whose inspirations range from old master and Mughal painting to that 20th-century master of arcana, John Graham…...  Lovable this imagery isn't, but it grows on you, largely because Ms. Speed's grasp of it is firm and her technical mastery impressive.”

-Grace Glueck (January 2006). " Art in Review” New York Times

“Julie Speed is an iconoclast in the truest sense of the word.  Hers is the iconoclasm of a most sophisticated outsider artist. Incongruity is always present in Speed’s work.”

Barbara Rose (April 2005)  “Julie Speed, Iconoclast” published by the Gerald Peters Gallery, NY

Solo exhibitions 
2019-2020  Julie Speed: East of the Sun & West of the Moon   The Taubman Museum of Art, Roanoke, Virginia 
2018-2019  Julie Speed: East of the Sun & West of the Moon   El Paso Museum of Art, El Paso,  Texas 
2017, Excerpts from the Undertoad: Julie Speed   LHUCA (Louise Hopkins Underwood Center for the Arts) Lubbock, Texas
2016-17 Julie Speed,   Evoke Contemporary, Santa Fe, N.M. 
2016 Julie Speed: Undertoad  The International Museum of Art & Science, McAllen,  Texas 
2016 Julie Speed: Undertoad  Ruiz-Healy Art, San Antonio, Texas and Flatbed Press, Austin, Texas
 2014 Julie Speed- Paper Cut: Selected Works on Paper The Grace Museum, Abilene, Texas
 2013 Julie Speed: Cut-up, Southwest School of Art,  San Antonio
 2012-2013  Julie Speed: Snug Harbor, Nicolaysen Art Museum, Casper, Wyoming and The Longview Museum of Art, Longview, Texas
 2011 The Pirate Queen Flatbed Press, Austin, Texas
 2011 Julie Speed, Boxes and Collages 2011 and The Pirate Queen & Other New Etchings Gerald Peters Gallery, New York, N.Y.
 2010  Julie Speed: Not From Here, Gerald Peters Gallery, New York, N.Y.
2008 Julie Speed, George Billis Gallery, New York, New York
2008 Julie Speed, George Billis Gallery, Los Angeles, California
2007 Talking Room, Galleri Urbane, Marfa, Texas
2007 Bible Studies, Westby Gallery, Rowan University, New Jersey
2006 Heads, Gerald Peters Gallery, Dallas, Texas
2006 Bible Studies, Gerald Peters Gallery, Dallas, Texas
2005 Bible Studies, Gerald Peters Gallery, Dallas, Texas
2005 Bible Studies, Flatbed Press, Austin, Texas
2005 Bible Studies, Galleri Urbane, Marfa, Texas
2005 Julie Speed, Gerald Peters Gallery, New York, New York
2004 Julie Speed, Blue Star Contemporary Art Center, San Antonio, Texas
2004 Julie Speed: Squares, Gerald Peters Gallery, Dallas, Texas
2003 The Murder of Kassimer Malevich, Etherington Fine Art, Vineyard Haven, Massachusetts
2003 Alters of My Ancestors, Art House, Jones Center for Contemporary Art, Austin Texas
2003 Alters of My Ancestors, Art Museum of Southeast Texas, Beaumont, Texas
2002 Alters of My Ancestors, Pillsbury and Peters Fine Art, Dallas, Texas
2002 Alters of My Ancestors, Lawndale Art Center, Houston, Texas
2002 Pillsbury and Peters, Dallas, Texas
2000 McMurtrey Gallery, Houston, Texas
2000 Queen of My Room: A Survey of Work by Julie Speed, 1989-1999, Dallas Visual Art Center, Dallas, Texas
2000 Queen of My Room: A Survey of Work by Julie Speed, 1989-1999, Galveston Arts Center, Galveston, Texas
2000 Queen of My Room: A Survey of Work by Julie Speed, 1989-1999, South Texas Institute for the Arts, Corpus Christi, Texas
1999 Queen of My Room: A Survey of Work by Julie Speed, 1989-1999, Austin Museum of Art, Austin, Texas
1997 McMurtrey Gallery, Houston, Texas
1997 Allene LaPides Gallery, Santa Fe, New Mexico
1996 Allene LaPides Gallery, Santa Fe, New Mexico
1995 Davidson Gallery, Seattle, Washington
1995 Tarrytown Gallery, Austin, Texas
1994 Carrington-Gallagher Gallery, San Antonio, Texas
1994 Ron Hall Gallery, Dallas, Texas
1993 Jansen-Perez Gallery, San Antonio, Texas
1992 Tarrytown Gallery, Austin, Texas
1991 Guerilla Gallery, Austin, Texas
1990 Scott-Allan Gallery, New York, New York
1989 Joy Horwitch Gallery, Chicago, Illinois
1989 J.B. Tollett Gallery, Austin, Texas

Other publications 
2018  Julie Speed : East of the Sun & West of the Moon https://www.amazon.com/dp/1532384750/ref=cm_sw_em_r_mt_dp_U_5cw-CbP1QEPC7  published by the El Paso Museum of Art  by Dr. Patrick Cable Shaw, preface by Victoria Ramirez, EPMA director 
Julie Speed: Snug Harbor Julie Speed, Lisa Hatchadoorian: 9780979848575: Amazon.com: Books https://www.amazon.com/dp/0979848571/ref=cm_sw_em_r_mt_dp_U_kiw-Cb430HDBB 
Paintings, Constructions, and Works on Paper, 2004,  University of Texas Press. . Includes color plates of 100 works, essays by art historians Elizabeth Ferrer and Edmund P. Pilsbury, and selected excerpts from "Books of Conversation" where Speed answers questions from the museum-goers.
Texas Monthly Talks. Interview with Evan Smith for KLRU-TV, Austin, Texas
"Behind the veil: visions of third eyes, dismembered body parts, monkeys and more appear to Julie Speed - and she paints them", 2005, Southwest Art.
Speed: art, 2003-2009, 2009, University of Texas Press. . Includes color plates of Speed's works, fiction by A. M. Homes, essay by art historian Elizabeth Ferrer, and essay by Julie Speed.
Queen of Her Room (trt: 27.28) A portrait of Julie Speed, visual artist and poet, for Gallery HD. Produced and Directed by Karen Bernstein
 Austin Now, Julie Speed produced by Domenique Bellavia KLRU television
 "I [art] Marfa", exilés artistiques au Texas 3/5, Episode 2: Julie Speed, artiste by Katie Callan et Sebastien Carayol, Produit par: Petit Dragon, en association avec ARTE France  3/7/2014
 A (Third) Eye for Detail by Antoine Sanfuentes  MSNBC.msn.com

References

External links 
 Official website
 bigbendnow.com/2013/04/marfa%E2%80%99s-julie-speed-named-2014-texas-distinguished-artist/
 www.austinchronicle.com/books/2004-05-28/212912/
 la.indymedia.org/news/2006/02/148112.php

1951 births
Living people
Artists from Texas
People from Austin, Texas
American women artists
Album-cover and concert-poster artists
21st-century American women